Christine Maree McMiken (born 19 June 1963) is a former New Zealand female athlete. She competed at the 1988 Summer Olympics in the Women's 10000 metres event.

References

External links 
 
 
 

1963 births
Living people
New Zealand female long-distance runners
Athletes (track and field) at the 1988 Summer Olympics
Olympic athletes of New Zealand
Athletes from Christchurch
Track and field athletes from Oklahoma